Tisochrysis lutea is a species of Haptophyta formerly known as Isochrysis affinis galbana
(Tahiti isolate) or 'T-iso'.

T. lutea is one of the most widely used species in aquaculture to feed oyster and shrimp larvae. It has an interesting composition for this application because of its high content of polyunsaturated fatty acids such as docosahexaenoic acid (DHA), stearidonic acid and alpha-linolenic acid. T. lutea contain betain lipids and phospholipids.

References 

High lipid content microalgae
Haptophyte species
Protists described in 2013